Six World Trade Center, building 6 of the World Trade Center in New York City was a U.S. Custom house. It was completed in 1972 at a height of 105 ft (32 m). 

It was heavily damaged during the September 11 attacks in 2001 by the collapse of the North Tower at 10:28 a.m. EDT and later demolished in December 2001.

The following is a list of tenants of Six World Trade Center prior to the terrorist attacks on September 11, 2001:

References

 

Lists of companies based in New York (state)
World Trade Center
Manhattan-related lists
Six